Ronald Finley (December 10, 1940 – July 5, 2016) was an American wrestler. He competed in the men's Greco-Roman featherweight at the 1964 Summer Olympics.

References

1940 births
2016 deaths
American male sport wrestlers
Olympic wrestlers of the United States
Wrestlers at the 1964 Summer Olympics
People from Huntington Park, California
Pan American Games medalists in wrestling
Pan American Games gold medalists for the United States
Wrestlers at the 1963 Pan American Games
20th-century American people